is a Japanese light novel series written by Takeru Uchida and illustrated by Nardack. The series began as a web novel series on the Shōsetsuka ni Narō website in 2012. It was then acquired by Shufunotomo beginning in 2013; fifteen volumes have been published as of October 2021. A manga adaptation by Karin Suzuragi began serialization in Kadokawa Shoten's Monthly Shōnen Ace magazine in December 2016, with fourteen tankōbon volumes released so far. An anime television series adaptation by Encourage Films aired from July to September 2019. In October 2019, Crunchyroll started showing the dubbed version.

Plot
Taichi Nishimura and Rin Azuma are two ordinary high school students who also happen to be childhood friends. On the way to school, a magic circle appears beneath their feet, and Taichi and Rin both get mysteriously transported to another world called Altianutz. While trying to grasp their current situation, they get attacked by a vicious monster. Luckily, a group of adventurers comes to their aid and rescues them. After arriving at a nearby town, they decide to enroll as adventurers themselves. While enrolling, they discover that they possess incredibly powerful magic and physical prowess. Thus, their adventure begins as the most powerful "cheat magicians". However, as Taichi is forced to discover, his presence in Altia was willed by a mysterious woman who wishes to use his power to control the fate of this world.

Characters

Main characters

A 15-year-old high school student and role-playing game fan blessed with good reflexes but lacking ambition. He is able to keep a clear head in a crisis situation, and is very optimistic and kind, even to the point of self-sacrifice. When he is displaced into Altia, he gains tremendous magical abilities (his magical capacity level is measured at 120,000, his magical power level at 40,000), ranking him as a natural (and very rare) Unique Magician who can directly tap into the elemental magical forces (as opposed to a normal Magician, who has to chant an incantation in order to make use of them). His specialty magic is being a Summoner who can directly call upon elemental spirits - in his case, Aerial - and their powers. Because of his power level giving him such a distinct advantage over most opponents, he considers himself a "cheat" Magician; hence the series' name.

 Taichi's agemate, schoolmate and childhood friend, who has long been harboring a crush on him. She is a very smart girl and has black hair (auburn in the manga and anime) which she keeps tied in a ponytail. After being displaced into Altia, she also gains high-ranking magical powers and becomes a rare Quad Magician (capacity 37,000, power 5,000) with the ability to use all of the basic four elemental forces Earth, Fire, Wind and Water. Although her overall magical capability is lower than Taichi's, she is able to apply her knowledge in physics to her magical manifestations, making her very versatile. 

A female master Triple Magician (capacity 43,000, power 6,000) capable of using Fire, Water, and Wind. She is known by the title "Mage of Fallen Leaves" (落葉の魔術師; Rakuyō no majutsushi). She becomes Taichi and Rin's mentor after discovering their extraordinary magical powers.

An Elf and a former apprentice of Lemia, she is a Dual Magician (capacity 30,500, power 3,800) capable of using the magical elements Fire and Earth. She is known under the title" Golden Swordswoman" for her skill with the blade. Impressed with Rin's abilities, the two girls become fast friends.
 /  /  / 

The Queen of Wind spirits who becomes bonded to Taichi. Originally she introduces herself as a simple Wind spirit named Aerial, but as Taichi's power rises, she finally evolves into her true identity.

Kingdom of Eristein

The king of Eristein, and an old acquaintance of Lemia. Due to his cosmopolitan plans to share Eristein's magical talents with the other neighboring realms, he has been challenged by traditionalist hardliners, like his brother Duke Dortesheim, who wish to preserve their country's superiority in magical prowess. In order to quell the looming civil war, he ordered the summoning of a being from another world who wields greater power than any other Magician in Altia - an individual who happens to be Taichi.

King Gilmar's daughter and the second royal princess of Eristein. A Unique Magician capable of manipulating time and space, it was she who summoned Taichi - and, by accident, Rin - to her world upon her father's order.

The daughter of Marquis Norman and a trusted retainer to King Gilmar and Princess Charlotte. She is also the designated archbishop of the Leija Church, a widespread religion of beneficence founded on the deeds of a canonized martyr named Leicia, and considered a saint by the Eristein populace.

The female high commander of King Gilmar's forces. After a practice fight with Taichi, she takes an instant liking to him and even boldly proposes to him.

King Gilmar's court magician, who is a Triple Magician controlling Fire, Earth and Water.

A young, talented magician at the royal court who is both awed and depressed by Rin and Myura's magical potential.
 Atsushi Tamaru (Raquelta),|Spike Spencer}} and Ayaka Nanase (Mejila)|Cristina Vee}}
A trio of high-ranking professional adventurers who save Taichi and Rin when they initially arrive in Altia and become their first friends.

A Dwarf and the master of the Azpire Adventurers Guild.

The Azpire Adventurers Guild's receptionist.

A young innkeeper's daughter from Azpire who befriends Taichi and Rin when they lodge into her parents' inn after becoming official adventurers.

A female assassin who attacked Taichi and Rin while they were investigating a case for the Adventurers Guild in the city of Azpire. Captured by them, and with her life spared by Taichi, she renounces her profession and becomes a guild member, and forms a crush on Taichi for his compassion. Shortly afterwards she dies in a battle against a monster horde attacking Azpire, thereby helping Taichi to discover his true potential and strengthen his resolve to keep his friends and loved ones safe.
 and 

Two young twin Magicians specializing in the Earth element.

Antagonists

The main antagonist to Taichi and Rin in the series. Officially the high cardinal of Eristein, he and his mistress, Lady Shade, pursue their own mysterious agenda with the two world-stranded teenagers.

The Spirit Queen of Darkness who engineered Taichi's displacement to Altia in order to use his power to take control of that world's fate.

A prideful young Magician and servant to Lodra who first meets Taichi and Rin posing as a fruit farmer while really hindering the real farmers' efforts in selling their produce. He specializes in summoning and controlling elemental spirits, and is a Crimson Pact Magician who uses the blood of living beings to imbue other creatures with power. After Taichi deprives him of his arm during their first fight, he begins to seek revenge on him.

A slightly unbalanced female Crimson Pact Magician and partner of Cassim who is always eager on engaging her enemies in single combat. Despite this, she has a warped sense of honor, despising underhanded methods like assassination in lieu of facing her opponents face-to-face. She specializes in Wind magic.

King Gilmar's younger brother. Displeased with his brother's open-minded politics, he has instigated a rebellion to seize the throne of Eristein, unaware that he is being used as a puppet by Lodra and his followers.

Duke Dortesheim's corrupt advisor who is secretly in league with Lady Shade's goals.

Others

Taichi and Rin's high school friend, and a natural athlete. He has long harbored a crush on Rin, and is therefore disappointed when he realizes that her heart belongs solely to Taichi. In the novels' prologue, he bears witness to Taichi and Rin's displacement into another world. He makes no appearance in the anime series.

Media

Light novels
The series was first published online on the Shōsetsuka ni Narō website in April 2012 by Takeru Uchida. It was later acquired by Shufunotomo, who published the first volume as a light novel under their Hero Bunko imprint in June 2013.

Manga
A manga adaptation of the series by Karin Suzuragi began publication in Kadokawa Shoten's Monthly Shōnen Ace on December 26, 2016.

A spinoff manga series by Taku Kawamura, titled , was serialized in Monthly Shōnen Ace from August 25, 2018 to October 26, 2019.

Volume list

Isekai Cheat Magician

Soreyuke! Isekai Cheat Magician

Anime
An anime adaptation was announced on April 16, 2018. The series was animated by Encourage Films and directed by Daisuke Tsukushi, with Takayo Ikami handling series composition, and Shuji Maruyama designing the characters. Yoshiaki Fujisawa composed the series' music. The series aired from July 10 to September 25, 2019 on AT-X, Tokyo MX, KBS, SUN, TVA, and BS11. MYTH & ROID performed the opening theme song "PANTA RHEI", while Rie Takahashi performed the ending theme song . The series ran for 12 episodes. An OVA episode premiered on July 5, 2021. Crunchyroll has licensed the series with a dub.

Notes

References

External links
Web novel website 
Official anime website 

2013 Japanese novels
Anime and manga based on light novels
AT-X (TV network) original programming
Crunchyroll anime
Encourage Films
Isekai anime and manga
Isekai novels and light novels
Japanese fantasy novels
Kadokawa Shoten manga
Light novels
Light novels first published online
Shōnen manga
Shōsetsuka ni Narō